Chukwunonso Tristan "Noni" Madueke (born 10 March 2002) is an English professional footballer who plays for Premier League club Chelsea, as a winger and attacking midfielder.

Early life
Madueke is of Nigerian Igbo descent. Born in Barnet, Madueke moved to the small village of Wintelre with his mother upon signing for PSV.

Club career

Early career
Madueke joined Crystal Palace at the age of nine and spent three years at the club. He subsequently joined Tottenham Hotspur; he captained their under-16 side and made his under-18 debut at the age of 15.

PSV
He moved to Dutch club PSV in June 2018, signing a three-year contract, and rejecting an offer from Manchester United in the process.

On 26 August 2019, Madueke made his senior debut in the Eerste Divisie for Jong PSV, coming on as a 64th minute substitute in a 1–0 loss to MVV Maastricht.

After making his debut for PSV's first team on 19 January 2020, in a 1–1 draw against VVV-Venlo, Madueke broke into the PSV team fully during the 2020–21 season, scoring on his first start for the club in a 2–1 win against Emmen on 19 September 2020. Madueke finished the season with seven Eredivisie goals. He was later described as having a "breakout" campaign, with nine goals and eight assists in all competitions.

On 7 August 2021, Madueke scored twice in a 4–0 Johan Cruyff Shield win against Ajax, in turn helping to end Ajax's 17 game unbeaten streak.

On 26 August 2021, Madueke signed a new contract with PSV, keeping him at the club until 2025. He was also given the number 10 jersey.

Chelsea
On 20 January 2023, Premier League club Chelsea announced the signing of Madueke on a seven-and-a-half year contract, for an estimated transfer fee £28.5 million (€33 million).

International career
Madueke has represented England at youth level, scoring twice in a qualifier against Denmark under-17 and was a squad member at the 2019 UEFA European Under-17 Championship.

Madueke made his U18 debut as a 70th minute substitute during the 3–2 win over Australia at De Montfort Park on 6 September 2019. He opened his goalscoring account for the U18s during a 2–0 win over South Korea at North Street on 10 September 2019.

On 15 March 2021, Madueke received his first England U21 call up as part of the Young Lions squad for the 2021 UEFA European Under-21 Championship and made his debut as a starter in the second group game, a 2–0 defeat to Portugal on 28 March 2021.

Style of play
Upon signing for PSV in June 2018, he was described by the club as "a creative, physically strong left-footed midfielder". Madueke's manager at PSV, Roger Schmidt, stated Madueke was "able to read situations, get to the right positions and be in the right place". The BBC described him as a "direct, powerful and versatile attacker" who was inspired by Cristiano Ronaldo.

Career statistics

Honours
PSV Eindhoven
KNVB Cup: 2021–22
Johan Cruyff Shield: 2021

References

2002 births
Living people
English footballers
England youth international footballers
Footballers from the London Borough of Barnet
Tottenham Hotspur F.C. players
PSV Eindhoven players
Jong PSV players
Eerste Divisie players
Association football midfielders
Association football wingers
English expatriate footballers
English expatriates in the Netherlands
Expatriate footballers in the Netherlands
English sportspeople of Nigerian descent
Eredivisie players
England under-21 international footballers
Black British sportspeople
Crystal Palace F.C. players
Chelsea F.C. players
Premier League players